Poul-Erik Thygesen (born 17 July 1950) is a Danish former professional footballer who played as a forward.

References

Living people
1950 births
Danish men's footballers
Association football forwards
Danish Superliga players
Bundesliga players
Boldklubben 1903 players
SV Werder Bremen players
FC Winterthur players